Italgas S.p.A. is an Italian company specialised in the distribution of natural gas.

It is listed on the Milan Stock Exchange and included in the FTSE MIB index.

History
The company was founded in Turin in 1837 under the name Compagnia di Illuminazione a Gaz per la Città di Torino (City of Turin Gas Lighting Company) and later changed its name several times, first becoming Società Italiana per il Gas (Italian Gas Company) and then Italgas S.p.A.
Catholic financiers, led by Bernardino Nogara, took an interest in Italgas during the years leading up to the Second World War. Among the company's chairmen was lawyer and entrepreneur Rinaldo Panzarasa. In 1967 control of the company passed to Snam, a member of the Eni Group. Under chairman Carlo Da Molo, Italgas undertook an extensive campaign to build methane distribution infrastructure, expanding considerably in Central and Southern Italy. In addition to strengthening its presence in the natural gas sector, the company also expanded its operations in the complete potable water cycle and entered the solid urban waste management business. However, these businesses were later discontinued, allowing Italgas to focus on its core natural gas business.

De-listing
On 7 February 2003 Eni launched a public takeover bid, resulting in the acquisition of all outstanding shares, and thus in the de-listing of the company. In 2009 Eni sold the company to its subsidiary Snam Rete Gas, which in 2012 became Snam.

Legal investigations
In July 2014 the company was placed under administration by commissioners due to dealings with various suppliers also subject to administration as a result of mafia infiltration. The investigations conducted by the authorities and the pro-active collaboration of the parent company, Snam, allowed the Court of Palermo to rescind the order in July 2015.

Return to the stock exchange
On 7 November 2016, after 13 years of absence, Italgas S.p.A. made its return to the stock exchange following the partial proportional de-merger of Snam, which involved the transfer of 86.5% of the equity interest held in Italgas Reti S.p.A. to the shareholders, at one Italgas share assigned to each five Snam shares held. A new board of directors was appointed on 4 April 2019, with university lecturer Alberto Dell'Acqua as the new chairman.

Major shareholders

 CDP Reti S.p.A. – 26.05%
 Snam S.p.A. – 13.5%
 Lazard Asset Management LLC – 8.6%
 Romano Minozzi – 4.29%
 BlackRock – 4.8%
 Other shareholders – 42.7%

Business operations
Over time Italgas S.p.A. has expanded its operations from Turin to the rest of Italy to cover over 35% of the market (2020), with concessions in approximately 1,800 municipalities, including some of the largest, such as Rome, managed directly or through its subsidiaries.

In 2021 Italgas bought DEPA infrastructure the company responsible for the gas distribution in Greece from DEPA for the sum of 733 million euros.

Group structure

Gas
 Italgas Reti (100%)
 Medea (51.85%)
 Metano Sant'Angelo Lodigiano (50%)
 Toscana Energia (50.66%)
 Toscana Energia Green (100%)
 Umbria Distribuzione Gas (45%)
 Gaxa (51.85%)

Water
 Italgas Acqua (100%)

Energy Efficiency
 Seaside (100%)

Museum
In 1994, after years of research and selection in its archives beginning in the Eighties, to commemorate 150 years in business Italgas created an historical archive and museum in Turin to store documents, volumes, pamphlets and advertisements of historical interest. Tools and equipment are displayed alongside paper documents to present natural gas technology from its origins.

Archive
The historical archive of Società Italiana per il Gas per Azione (covering the period 1856 – 1979) includes a core set of historical documents dating from the mid-nineteenth century to 1967, chosen as a watershed year due to the inclusion of Italgas in the state-owned enterprise system through Snam. This core set has been expanded on numerous occasions over the years, and the historical archive currently extends to 1979, while the repository, occupying over approximately 1.5 km, includes documents from 1980 to 2003. The facility also includes a collection of at least 30,000 photographs of workshops, working methods, company buildings, gas metres and various celebrations, in addition to maps, designs, plans and an audiovisual collection. The archive also includes the Società azionaria per la condotta di acque potabili di Torino collection (covering the period from 1852 to the second half of the 20th century). Since 2011 the Italgas film collection has been kept in the company section of Italy's National Business Cinema Archive (covering the period 1929–1984); it consists of institutional and advertising films illustrating the company's history from the Twenties to the Eighties.

References

1837 establishments in Italy